The Union Railroad Clairton Bridge, commonly known as the Clairton Coke Works Bridge, is a truss bridge that formerly carried traffic between Clairton, Pennsylvania and Lincoln, Pennsylvania for the Pennsylvania Union Railroad which is owned and operated by Transtar, Inc., a subsidiary of the United States Steel Corporation. The structure, which featured a single track, has been out of service since the 1970s; rail traffic was rerouted to the US Steel Clairton Works as the steel industry began to decline. The bridge is currently slated to become part of the Montour Trail, one of many current Pittsburgh-area bike trails projects.

External links

References

Railroad bridges in Pennsylvania
Bridges over the Monongahela River
Bridges completed in 1893
Bridges in Allegheny County, Pennsylvania
U.S. Steel
Metal bridges in the United States
1893 establishments in Pennsylvania